Bloody Christmas may refer to:
 Bloody Christmas of Sendling (1705), also called the Sendling's night of murder, a massacre in Bavaria, Germany during the Bavarian People's Uprising
 Bloody Christmas (1920), a series of clashes in Rijeka (Fiume)
 Bloody Christmas (1945), a campaign of executions of Bulgarians in the Yugoslav Republic of Macedonia
 Bloody Christmas (1951), an incident of police brutality in Los Angeles
Bloody Christmas (1956), a massacre of civilians by the government of Cuba
 Bloody Christmas (1963), a series of events initiating the outbreak of the tension between the Greek Cypriots and the Turkish Cypriots
 Bugesera invasion (1963), also known as the "Bloody Christmas" (French: Noël Rouge)